Florent Zitte (born 17 May 1993) is a French footballer who currently plays for the French side Luzenac AP as a striker.His main position is Centre-Forward. Currently he has retired. His last club was Semen Padang.

Career
Zitte was born in Saint-Denis, Réunion. He made his Ligue 1 debut for AS Nancy in the 2012–13 season. In 2013, the club was relegated to Ligue 2.

In February 2019, Zitte joined the Indonesian club Semen Padang. He played two games for the club in the Indonesia President's Cup and scored in both. However, it was announced on 4 March 2019 that he had left the club.

References

External links
 

1993 births
Living people
Association football forwards
French footballers
AS Nancy Lorraine players
Royale Union Saint-Gilloise players
Luzenac AP players
Semen Padang F.C. players